Bob Karstens was a professional basketball player in the United States. Karstens was born in Davenport, Iowa and attended school at Iowa Central Turner Gym and St. Ambrose College. A white man, Karstens was the third non-black player on the Harlem Globetrotters' roster.  First was owner Abe Saperstein as a substitute in the team's first year. Second was Rob Nichol a Canadian in 1941.  He invented a few routines including the magic circle and the yo yo basketball.   He played on the All Black Team, 8 years before the NBA was integrated. He stayed on as a team manager from 1954 to 1994.  He died on December 31, 2004.

References 

Harlem Globetrotters players
2004 deaths
People from Davenport, Iowa
St. Ambrose University alumni